Presern or Prešern is a surname. Notable people with the surname include: 

Bojan Prešern (born 1962), Slovenian rower
Carole Presern, British medical administrator